In abstract algebra, an -algebra  is finite if it is finitely generated as an -module. An -algebra can be thought as a homomorphism of rings , in this case  is called a finite morphism if  is a finite -algebra.

The definition of finite algebra is related to that of algebras of finite type.

Finite morphisms in algebraic geometry 
This concept is closely related to that of finite morphism in algebraic geometry; in the simplest case of affine varieties, given two affine varieties ,  and a dominant regular map , the induced homomorphism of -algebras  defined by  turns  into a -algebra: 

  is a finite morphism of affine varieties if  is a finite morphism of -algebras.

The generalisation to schemes can be found in the article on finite morphisms.

References

See also 
Finite morphism
Finitely generated algebra
Finitely generated module

Commutative algebra
Algebraic geometry
Algebras